The Tiandihui, the Heaven and Earth Society, also called Hongmen (the Vast Family), is a Chinese fraternal organization and historically a secretive folk religious sect in the vein of the Ming loyalist White Lotus Sect, the Tiandihui's ancestral organization. As the Tiandihui spread through different counties and provinces, it branched off into many groups and became known by many names, including the  Sanhehui. The Hongmen grouping is today more or less synonymous with the whole Tiandihui concept, although the title "Hongmen" is also claimed by some criminal groups. Its current iteration is purely secular.

Under British rule in Hong Kong, all Chinese secret societies were collectively seen as criminal threats and were bundled together and defined as "Triads", although the Hongmen might be said to have differed in its nature from others. The name of the "Three Harmonies Society" (the "Sanhehui" grouping of the Tiandihui) is in fact the source of the term "Triad" that has become synonymous with Chinese organized crime. Because of that heritage, the Tiandihui (more commonly known there as "Triads') is both controversial and prohibited in Hong Kong.

History
Republican-era scholars generally thought that the Tiandihui was founded by Ming loyalists in the early Qing dynasty to resist the Manchu invasion of China. In 1964, scholar Cai Shaoqing published the article On the Origins of the Tiandihui based on his research of Qing archives (now known as the First Historical Archives) in Beijing. He concluded that the Tiandihui was founded in 1761 and its roots lay in mutual aid rather than national politics. His interpretation was further developed by his student Qin Baoqi and confirmed by independent research by the Taiwanese scholar Zhuang Jifa.

The founders of the Tiandihui—Ti Xi, Li Amin, Zhu Dingyuan, and Tao Yuan—were all from Zhangpu, Zhangzhou, Fujian, on the border with Guangdong. They left Zhangpu for Sichuan, where they joined a local cult and left disenchanted. Of the four, Ti Xi soon left for Guangdong, where he organized a group of followers in Huizhou. In 1761, he returned to Fujian and organized his followers from both provinces to form the Tiandihui.

A century earlier, the Qing dynasty made membership in such societies illegal, driving them into the arms of the anti-Qing resistance, for whom they now served as an organizational model. The 18th century saw a proliferation of such societies, some of which were devoted to overthrowing the Qing, such as the Tiandihui, which had established itself in the Zhangpu and Pinghe counties of Zhangzhou in 1766. By 1767, Lu Mao had organized within the Tiandihui a campaign of robberies to fund their revolutionary activities.

The Tiandihui began to claim that their society was born of an alliance between Ming dynasty loyalists and five survivors of the destruction of Shaolin Monastery—Cai Dezhong, Fang Dahong, Ma Chaoxing, Hu Dedi, and Li Shikai—by the Qing forged at the Honghua Ting ("Vast or Red Flower Pavilion"), where they swore to devote themselves to the mission of "Fan Qing Fu Ming".

In 1768 anti-Qing Tiandihui rebel Zhao Liangming claimed to be a descendant of the imperial house of the Song dynasty.

The merchant Koh Lay Huan, who had been involved in these subversive activities, had to flee China, arriving in Siam and the Malay States, to eventually settle in Penang as its first Kapitan China before dying in 1826.

During the late 19th century, branches of the Hongmen were formed by Chinese communities overseas, notably the United States, Canada, and Australia, where they are nowadays known as "Chinese Freemasons".

Following the overthrow of the Qing Dynasty of China in 1911, the Hongmen suddenly found themselves without purpose. From then on, the Hongmen diverged into various groups. When some Hongmen groups based within China could no longer rely on donations from sympathetic locals; being unable to resume normal civilian lives after years of hiding, they turned to illegal activities – thus giving birth to the modern Triads.

The Hongmen today
The Hongmen is believed to consist of about 300,000 members worldwide, members found in mainland China, Taiwan, and Chinese overseas communities. Membership is overwhelmingly ethnically Chinese but there are also Japanese members and a few white American members. The Hongmen are divided into branches, of which there are believed to be approximately 180. The largest of the branches, Wu Sheng Shan, consists of perhaps 180,000 members. Membership is said to be primarily working class, and is also said to include a considerable membership in the armed forces of the Republic of China (Taiwan).

Hongmen members worldwide continue to observe certain common traditions: they all stress their patriotic origin; they all revere Lord Guan, a deified historic Chinese figure who embodies righteousness, patriotism, and loyalty; and they all share certain rituals and traditions such as the concept of brotherhood and a secret handshake.

Hong Kong
Today, the Hongmen is an illegal society in Hong Kong because of its traditional association with the triads.

Taiwan
In Taiwan, by contrast, the Hongmen is not only legal, but politically influential; this is not surprising, since Sun Yat-sen, founding father of the Republic of China, was a senior figure within the Hongmen, as was nationalist leader Chiang Kai-shek. Moreover, the Kuomintang, or Chinese Nationalist Party, was formed from the Xingzhonghui and Guangfuhui, groups not unlike the Hongmen.

Because of the Hongmen's revolutionary character and mysterious quality, their future was unclear after the Republic of China central government moved to Taiwan.  For a long time, the Republic of China on Taiwan did not openly allow the Hongmen to operate.  After martial law ended in 1989, Ge Shan Tang formed and started exchange with the outside world.

Under the influence of Chiang Kai-shek, the Hongmen attempted to remain somewhat secretive, but in recent years the organization's activities have been more transparent.

The organization also has numerous business interests, and is reportedly trying to open a martial arts school in Taiwan.

On 1 January 2004, Nan Hua Shan Tang was registered with Taiwan's Ministry of the Interior.

Mainland China
In Mainland China, the Hongmen is known as the Zhi Gong Party, a political party that participates in the Chinese People's Political Consultative Conference. Wan Gang, president of the Zhi Gong Party, is currently the only non-Communist Party minister in the Chinese government.

Canada
The Canadian branch was established in 1863 in Barkerville, British Columbia. In 1971, Chinese Freemasons National Headquarters of Canada was incorporated under the Canadian Corporations Act on 31 May 1971, and registered on 22 July 1971. The Barkerville headquarter was donated to British Columbia government.

Other
The Hongmen continues to exist within numerous overseas Chinese communities, albeit with rapidly aging memberships; its main purposes today are to act as fraternities among overseas Chinese, and to participate in charitable activities. On 28 July 1992 the Hongmen held their 3rd Worldwide Hongmen Conference in the United States. Over 100 worldwide representatives attended for two days of discussion and adopted organizational rules, proclaimed the founding of a worldwide Hongmen association. First session President Li Zhipeng announced the construction of the Hongmen headquarters in Honolulu.

Biographies
A biography based on the Canadian Chinese Freemasons documents titled 'History of Hongmen and Chinese Freemasons in Canada' was written by Dr. David Chuenyan Lai of University of Victoria.

Popular culture

Fiction

The Tiandihui was mentioned in The Deer and the Cauldron, a wuxia novel by Louis Cha. In the story, Tiandihui was prominently mentioned and played a major role in the storyline. The protagonist, Wei Xiaobao, became the hallmaster of Tiandihui Qingmu Hall based in Peking (present day Beijing).

See also

 14K Triad
 Bamboo Union
 China Zhi Gong Party
 Da Cheng Rebellion 
 Five Elders
 Ghee Hin Kongsi
 Green Gang
 Hai San
 Lin Shuangwen rebellion 
 Ngee Heng Kongsi of Johor
 Secret society
 Tong (organization)
 Tongmenghui
 Xiantiandao

References

Further reading

External links
Tiandihui (Overseas Chinese Affairs Commission, Republic of China)
Hongmen website 

Triad (organized crime)
Economic history of China
Chinese secret societies
1761 establishments in Asia
Organizations established in 1761
Zhangzhou
1760s establishments in China
History of Fujian